Mystery, Alaska is a 1999 American sports comedy-drama film, directed by Jay Roach, about an amateur ice hockey team from the fictional small town of Mystery that plays an exhibition game against the National Hockey League (NHL)'s New York Rangers. It was shot in Canmore, Alberta, mostly in what is today known as Quarry Lake Park.

Plot
Sheriff John Biebe is one of the townsfolk in Mystery, Alaska who play in "the Saturday Game" — a weekly hockey game played on an open pond. The entire hockey-mad town turns out every week to watch. Donna, John's wife, arrives with the latest edition of Sports Illustrated, which features an article on the town and the Saturday Game. While describing team members' strengths, it refers to John as being "slow in the feet"; but it concludes with a statement that in the ability to skate, the Mystery team rivals any team in the National Hockey League (NHL).

Judge Burns and his son Birdie get into an argument about the game, with the judge saying that Birdie doesn't play well because he doesn't pass. During the next week, John is called into the Mayor's office to be told that he is being dropped from the Saturday game, in favor of teenager Stevie Weeks.

John congratulates Stevie at the diner, but is called away because Connor Banks, the team's best player, has just shot someone. The deputy explains that Connor and a representative checking out the town for Price World (a business chain embodying a threat to local business) got into an argument. Connor fired a shot to frighten him, but the bullet ricocheted and hit the rep in the foot. Charles “Charlie” Danner, the author of the Sports Illustrated article and a native of Mystery, arrives at the town hall in a helicopter. He explains that as a result of his article, the NHL suggested that the New York Rangers be brought up to Mystery to play the town's team in a televised exhibition game.

At the town meeting, the mayor re-introduces Charlie, who seems to have been unpopular while growing up in Mystery. Charlie was once romantically connected with Donna. Initially feelings about the match are mixed, but then Birdie indicates his eagerness to play and the game is given a rousing endorsement. Later when John is approached by the mayor, he assumes that he will be invited back onto the team. However, the mayor wants John only to coach: Judge Burns has refused to do so. John says that he doesn’t know how to coach.

Connor Banks' arraignment is brought before Judge Burns and his attorney Bailey Pruit accepts a trial date for the following week. Connor doesn't want a trial so soon because if he loses, he would miss the upcoming game. Bailey tells him not to worry because no jury will lock up the town’s star player. At Connor’s trial, Bailey asks the victim, Mr. Walsh, what he thinks of Mystery, and asks him to confirm verbatim transcripts of his disparaging the town. The jury delivers a "not guilty" verdict. Amid much jubilation, Judge Burns angrily addresses those assembled, telling them that they have exalted the hockey game above what is right, disgracing themselves and his courtroom. Birdie confronts him in his chambers, saying he feels that his father has always been ashamed of him for staying in town to play hockey, instead of going to college.

It emerges that the Rangers players are not keen to play the match, which they disparage as a joke. Crew from the TV network arrive. They want to call the team the Mystery Eskimos, to which John and the mayor take offense. John asks Judge Burns to coach as he doesn’t know how to, but the Judge turns him down.

Preparations for the match continue. It becomes obvious that this is now much more than a game of pond hockey.

Charlie tells the mayor that the Rangers players have filed a grievance with their players' union, so they are no longer coming. The mayor punches Charlie, giving him a bloody nose. Judge Burns tells Bailey that there is a hearing in New York over the legal dispute. He says it might be useful for Mystery to have a presence, and suggests a few legal arguments Bailey could use.

At the hearing, Bailey makes an impassioned plea for the game to continue. Unfortunately, he suffers a fatal heart attack while arguing the case. After the funeral back in Mystery, it is revealed that he won the case, and the game is back on. John confronts the judge, saying that since he sent Bailey to New York, he now has to take over coaching. The judge agrees only if John comes back on the team as captain.

Under the guidance of the judge, the team trains frantically for the match.

The Rangers players arrive and are greeted by the mayor and townsfolk, who are all amazed at their size. John must deal with Charlie driving drunkenly on a Zamboni. They talk and Charlie reveals his bitterness towards Mystery, which he believes has rejected him. John points out that bringing the Rangers to Mystery could destroy the town if its team were to lose badly.

During the match, the Mystery team take time to settle, but eventually go ahead two goals to nothing in the first period. One of the goals is scored by Stevie, who impresses the commentators with his speed. In the second period the Rangers score five unanswered goals. Birdie costs the team a goal through his desire to “go it alone” when he should have passed. Unwilling to accept defeat, Mystery scores two goals in the third period, including one from a pass that Birdie makes instead of shooting for goal himself. As the clock ticks down, Connor has a chance to level the scores, but his shot hits the crossbar. The game is over, with the score 5 – 4 for the Rangers. Both the Mystery team and spectators appear completely deflated until Judge Burns  claps for them, after which even the Rangers players applaud them.

The following day the Rangers leave. Both Stevie Weeks and Connor Banks have been given minor league contracts, and they fly out with the Rangers.

Cast

Reception
Mystery, Alaska received mixed-to-negative reviews. Along with the original consensus "The lack of hockey action and authenticity left critics cold," Rotten Tomatoes ranked the movie with 38%. It had very poor take-ins as well, grossing only $8,891,623, against an estimated budget of $28 million.

Accolades
The film is recognized by American Film Institute in these lists:
 2006: AFI's 100 Years...100 Cheers – Nominated
 2008: AFI's 10 Top 10: Nominated Sports Film

References

External links

1999 films
Hollywood Pictures films
1990s sports comedy-drama films
American sports comedy-drama films
American ice hockey films
1990s English-language films
Films directed by Jay Roach
Films scored by Carter Burwell
Films set in Alaska
Films shot in Alberta
New York Rangers
Northern (genre) films
1990s American films